The Battle of Reisen, Battle of Sorge River or Battle of Sirgune River took place in 1233–34 between the Teutonic knights and the Pomesanians in the Prussian crusade. The Teutonic Knights, along with some crusaders, defeated the Old Prussians, which allowed them to continue further fortress constructions in the region of Sirgune. According to the chronicle, Swantopolk the Great had planned for the Prussian attack, and when they met their enemy at Sirgune, he set up roadblocks on the undergrowths behind the Prussians, and when the Prussians retreated, the crusaders destroyed them.

References
Citations

Bibliography

 
 

Reisen
Reisen